The Bad Mother's Handbook is a one-off television drama film based on the novel The Bad Mother's Handbook by Kate Long. It was broadcast on ITV on 19 February 2007, starring Catherine Tate, Anne Reid, Holly Grainger and Robert Pattinson. According to BARB, the show received strong viewing figures of 6.09 million.

Plot
Karen (Catherine Tate) is a mother in her thirties, raising teenaged Charlotte (Holly Grainger). Karen's mother Nan (Anne Reid) is suffering from Alzheimer's.

American remake
In 2008, ABC was developing a pilot known as Bad Mother's Handbook to star Alicia Silverstone, Megan Mullally and Alia Shawkat, but it was not picked up.

The DVD Release

The British version, starring Catherine Tate, was released on 24 August 2010.

References

External links
Kate Long the author

2007 television films
2007 films
British television films
ITV television dramas
Films about adoption
British pregnancy films
Television series by All3Media
Films set in England
2000s English-language films